Deadly Sins is an American documentary television series on Investigation Discovery that debuted on March 3, 2012. The series  examines the true evils that push people beyond the limits of the law and reveals crimes driven by the most basic of human instincts and is hosted by American criminal lawyer Darren Kavinoky.

References

2012 American television series debuts
2017 American television series endings
Investigation Discovery original programming
2010s American documentary television series
2010s American crime television series